Russell Simpson may refer to:

 Russell Simpson (actor) (1880–1959), American character actor
 Russell Simpson (tennis) (born 1954), New Zealand tennis player